Melba Montgomery is a eponymous studio album by American country artist, Melba Montgomery. It was released in March 1978 via United Artists Records and was the twenty second studio disc of her career. The album featured a total of ten tracks, four of which were originally released as singles. Its most commercially-successful was a cover of "Angel of the Morning". The song reached both the American and Canadian country charts in 1978.

Background, recording and content
Melba Montgomery had recently reached success as a solo artist after years of duet recordings. Her 1974 single, "No Charge", topped the country charts. The song, along with several other recordings, were released through Elektra Records. It was then announced that Montgomery would sign with United Artists Records and begin working under the production of Larry Butler. He would produce Montgomery's eponymous album, along with Pete Drake. The project was recorded in September 1976 at the Jack Clement Studio, located in Nashville, Tennessee.

The album's ten tracks featured diverse instrumentation from steel guitars, along with strings and background vocals. Two songs were penned by Nashville songwriter and artist, Linda Hargrove: "You Sure Saved Me from Myself" and "Hope for Your Happiness". Producer Larry Butler contributed to the writing of the final track, "Never Ending Love Affair". A cover of Merrilee Rush's "Angel of the Morning" was also included on the project.

Release, reception and singles
Melba Montgomery was released in March 1978 on United Artists Records. It marked the twenty second studio album released in Montgomery's recording career. It was distributed as a vinyl LP, featuring five tracks on either side of the record. Billboard gave the album a positive reception, naming it among its "Recommended LP's" in 1978. The publication named "Angel of the Morning", "Never Ending Love Affair" and "Before the Pain Comes" as the album's "best cuts". Four singles were included on the disc. Its first was "Never Ending Love Affair", which was originally released in June 1977. The single reached number 83 on the American Billboard Hot Country Songs chart that year. 

"Before the Pain Comes" was also originally released as a single in August 1977. "Angel of the Morning" was released in November 1977. The song was the highest-charting from the album, peaking at number 22 on the Billboard country chart and number 48 on the Canadian RPM Country chart. "Leavin' Me in Your Mind" was issued as a single in February 1978.

Track listing

Personnel
All credits are adapted from the liner notes of Melba Montgomery.

Musical personnel
 Tommy Allsup – Bass guitar
 Stu Basore – Steel guitar
 George Binkley – Strings
 Jim Buchanan – Fiddle
 Kenneth Buttrey – Drums
 Jimmy Capps – Acoustic guitar
 Jerry Carrigan – Drums
 Fred Carter Jr. – Bass guitar
 Marvin Chantry – Strings
 Roy Christensen – Strings
 Pete Drake – Steel guitar
 Ray Edenton – Acoustic guitar
 Paul Franklin – Steel guitar
 Carl Gorodetsky – Strings
 Lenny Haight – Strings
 Buddy Harman – Drums
 Kelso Herston – Bass guitar
 Randy Hillman – Bass
 Shane Keister – Piano

 Sheldon Kurland – Strings
 Kenny Malone – Drums
 Charlie McCoy – Harmonica
 Martha McCrory – Strings
 Melba Montgomery – Lead vocals
 Bob Moore – Bass
 Hargus "Pig" Robbins – Piano
 Pam Rose – Acoustic guitar
 Jack Salomon – Acoustic guitar
 Billy Sanford – Electric guitar
 Larry Sasser – Steel guitar
 Lang Scruggs – Banjo
 Jerry Shook – Acoustic guitar 
 Steven Smith – Strings
 Donald Teal – Strings
 Jeff Tweel – Piano
 Gary Vanosdale – Strings
 Pete Wade – Electric guitar
 Tommy Williams – Fiddle
 Bobby Wood – Piano

Technical personnel
 Larry Butler – Producer
 Pete Drake – Producer
 Billy Sherrill – Engineer

Release history

References

1978 albums
Albums produced by Larry Butler (producer)
Albums produced by Pete Drake
Melba Montgomery albums
United Artists Records albums